In anatomy, an eyestalk (sometimes spelled eye stalk and also known as an ommatophore) is a protrusion that extends an eye away from the body, giving the eye a better field of view. It is a common feature in nature and frequently appears in fiction.

In nature 
Eyestalks are a specialized type of tentacle. Tentacles may also have olfactory organs at their ends. Examples of creatures with olfactory tentacles include snails, the trilobite superfamily Asaphida, and the fly family Diopsidae. In slugs and snails, these tentacles will regrow if severely damaged, and in some species, are retractable. Crustaceans also have eyestalks, consisting of two segments.

Gallery

See also 
 Eyestalk ablation
 The cephalofoils of Hammerhead sharks

References 

Animal anatomy